The 2019–20 season was Reading's 149th year in existence and seventh consecutive season in the Championship, and covers the period from 1 July 2019 to 22 July 2020.

Season review

Pre-season
On 14 May, Reading announced that they would be heading to Estepona on 7 July, for a two-week training camp that would feature a number of friendly matches.

On 20 June, the fixture list for the 2019–20 EFL Championship season was released, with Reading opening their campaign at home to Sheffield Wednesday, and a couple of hours later Reading where drawn away to Wycombe Wanderers in the first round of the EFL Cup. On 28 June, Reading announced a new principal sponsorship deal with Casumo for two years.

On 2 July, Nicky Shorey returned to the club, taking up the role of Academy Lead Scout, and Mehmet Ali joined from Tottenham Hotspur as U23 Assistant Coach. Three days later, Liam Moore was confirmed as club captain, replacing Paul McShane who had left the club following the expiration of his contract. On 22 July, John O'Shea returned to the club as First Team Coach.

Transfers and contracts
On 20 June, Lewis Ward moved to Exeter City for an undisclosed fee.
On 27 June, Tyler Frost, Adam Liddle and Ramarni Medford-Smith all signed new professional deals until the end of the 2019–20 season, whilst Adam Desbois, Marcel Elva-Fountaine and Roberto Nditi signed their first professional contracts also until the end of the season.

On 8 July, Liam Kelly moved to Feyenoord on a permanent transfer, and Darren Sidoel left the club by mutual consent. On 11 July, Reading announced the season-long loan signing of João Virgínia from Everton. The following day, Reading announced that Jón Daði Böðvarsson had left the club to join Millwall on a permanent transfer. On 15 July, Michael Olise signed a three-year professional contract with Reading. Later that week, on 19 July, Reading announced the signing of Michael Morrison on a two-year contract after his Birmingham City contract expired at the end of the previous season. Reading announced the signing of Charlie Adam on 22 July on a one-year contract after his Stoke City contract expired at the end of the previous season. Two days later, 24 July, Reading announced the return of Matt Miazga on a season-long loan deal from Chelsea, and that forward Marc McNulty had moved to Sunderland on loan for the season. At the end of the month, Reading announced the half-season loan of Liam Driscoll to Yeovil Town and the release of David Meyler, on 30 and 31 July respectively.

On 1 August, Luke Southwood moved to Hamilton Academical on loan until 5 January 2020. The following day, Reading announced the signing of Lucas Boyé on a season-long loan deal from Torino, whilst Sam Smith moved to Cambridge United on loan for the season.

Matches
On 6 July, Reading won their first preseason friendly in two seasons, a 2–0 victory over Southend United at their Hogwood Training Ground, with goals coming from Michael Olise in the first half and Modou Barrow in the second half. Four days later, Reading defeated Gibraltar United 10–0 in the first game of their Spanish tour in Marbella. Danny Loader scored a hat-trick, Jordan Holsgrove and Yakou Méïté both scored braces and Andrija Novakovich, Tom McIntyre and Josh Barrett also scored. Reading's second game in Spain was against Sevilla at the Estadio Municipal Felipe del Valle in San José de la Rinconada. Reading took the lead in the 57th minute through Novakovich, before a Nolito penalty and José Lara goal game the La Liga club the victory.
On 16 July Reading took part in two friendly matches, the first being a 0–0 draw against Malaga B, with the second being a 1–0 victory over Extremadura thanks to a 60th-minute Loader penalty. Reading ended their Spanish tour by playing two games on 20 July, the first being a 1–0 defeat to Lincoln City, with Granada defeating Reading by the same scoreline later in the evening. On Wednesday 24 July, Reading drew with Birmingham City in a behind-doors friendly at Hogwood Park, with the only Reading goal coming from Novakovich.
Later on in the afternoon of 24 July, Reading defeated Peterborough United 4–2, with the Reading goals coming from Tyler Blackett, Barrow, John Swift and Barrett. 
Reading finished their pre-season preparations by hosting Chelsea at the Madejski Stadium on 28 July. Reading took the lead through Barrett in the first half before Ross Barkley and Kenedy scored seeing Chelsea go into half time leading 2–1. Shortly into the second half Michael Morrison equalised before a quick fire double from Mason Mount saw Chelsea take a 4–2 lead. With 19 minutes to go, Sam Baldock pulled one goal back to leave the final score Reading 3–4 Chelsea.

August
At the start of August, Myles Roberts joined Tonbridge Angels on loan after former Reading goalkeeper Jon Henly was ruled out with a shoulder injury.

Reading's first match of the season was a 1–3 home defeat to Sheffield Wednesday on 3 August, with Yakou Méïté scoring Reading's only goal.

On 5 August Adam Desbois left Reading to join Brighton & Hove Albion, whilst Rafael was released by Sampdoria, with Reading signing him on a three-year contract the following day. Also on 6 August, Reading announced the season-long loan signing of Pelé from AS Monaco, and the signing of Lucas João on a four-year contract from Sheffield Wednesday. On 7 August, George Pușcaș signed for Reading on a five-year contract from Inter Milan for an undisclosed fee. On Transfer Deadline day, 8 August, Ovie Ejaria returned to the club on a season-long loan from Liverpool with a view to a permanent move, whilst Lexus Beeden joined the U23 squad from Tooting & Mitcham. Reading played their second game of the season on 10 August, a 2–1 away defeat to Hull City with Lucas João scoring Readings only goal of the game midway through the second half.

On 12 August, Modou Barrow moved to Denizlispor on a season-long loan deal, with Reading confirming the deal a day later. Also on 13 August, Yeovil Town confirmed that Liam Driscoll had returned to Reading after suffering an injury with The Glovers.

Reading took part in the First Round of the EFL Cup on 13 August, drawing 1–1 away to Wycombe Wanderers with George Pușcaș scoring the equaliser in the 63rd minute to force penalties. Reading's debut goalkeeper Rafael Cabral saved two out of four penalties he faced with Reading scoring all of theirs to progress 4–2 on penalties. Following the match the second round draw was made, with Reading being given an away trip to Plymouth Argyle.

On 16 August, Adrian Popa moved to FCSB on a season-long loan deal.

On 27 August, Jordan Holsgrove joined Atlético Baleares on a season-long loan deal.

On 30 August, Tennai Watson joined Coventry City on loan until 2 January 2020.

September
On 2 September, Andrija Novakovich left Reading in a permanent transfer to Frosinone for an undisclosed fee, and Tom Holmes joined Roeselare on a season-long loan.

On 18 September, Reading announced the signing of goalkeeper James Holden, winger Femi Azeez and forward Augustus McGiff to their academy.

On 20 September, Akin Odimayo joined Hungerford Town on a one-month loan deal.

On 25 September, Myles Roberts joined Bognor Regis Town on loan.

At the end of September, James Holden joined Bognor Regis Town on loan as cover for the injured Myles Roberts.

October
On 1 October, Yakou Méïté extended his contract with Reading until the summer of 2023.

On 4 October, after two clean sheets in two games for Bognor Regis Town, James Holden joined Bracknell Town on loan a short-term loan deal.

On 8 October, Reading announced the singing of Werick Caetano on a contract until the end of the season, with Caetano joining up with the U23.

On 9 October, Reading sacked manager José Gomes. On 14 October, Mark Bowen was appointed as Gomes' replacement moving down from the role of Sporting Director.

On 21 October, 17-year-old defender Jeriel Dorsett signed his first professional contract with the club until the summer of 2021.

On 26 October, Reading's away match against Nottingham Forest was postponed due to the adverse weather conditions in the East Midlands.

On 28 October, Gabriel Osho featured on trial for Ipswich Town U23's in their game against Coventry City.

November
On 12 November, Ramarni Medford-Smith joined Torquay United on loan until 1 January 2020, whilst Ben House joined Dagenham & Redbridge also on loan until 1 January 2020.

On 22 November, Jökull Andrésson signed a new contract with Reading, keeping him at the club until the summer of 2022.

On 26 November, Reading confirmed that Academy Manager Ged Roddy had left the club.

December
On 2 December, Reading were drawn at home to Blackpool in the Third Round of the 2019–20 FA Cup.

On 4 December, Reading announced that Michael Gilkes had been appointed as Academy Manager, after Ged Roddy left the club in November.

On 7 December, Reading confirmed that Gabriel Osho had joined Yeovil Town on loan until 4 January 2020.

On 16 December, Readings postponed match against Nottingham Forest on 26 October, was confirmed as being rearranged to 22 January 2020 at 19:45.

January
Reading began January with a 2–1 victory over Fulham at Craven Cottage thanks to goals from John Swift, his third goal in as many games, and Charlie Adam. Reading's second game of January came on 4 January at home to Blackpool in the Third Round of the FA Cup. Reading went behind to a 28th-minute goal from Nathan Delfouneso, before Sam Baldock equalised in the 56th. Armand Gnanduillet restored Blackpools lead in the 60th minute before Danny Loader equalised in the 66th. In the 68th minute Teddy Howe conceded a penalty, with Gnanduillet stepping up and trying a Panenka, which came back off the crossbar before being cleared, leaving the match to end 2–2.

On 6 January, Thierry Nevers signed his first professional contract with Reading, until the summer 2021.

On 9 January, Mark Bowen was nominated for the December Championship Manager of the Month, whilst Rafael Cabral was nominated for December Player of the Month.

On 17 January, Bowen extended his contract as Reading manager until the summer of 2021.

On 28 January, Conor Lawless signed a new contract with Reading, keeping him at the club until the summer of 2021.

Transfers
On 7 January, Josh Barrett left the club to join Bristol Rovers on a permanent contract, and João Virgínia returned to Everton.
On 13 January, New Zealand international midfielder Matthew Ridenton joined Reading for a week-long trial. On 16 January, Jack Nolan moved to Walsall for an undisclosed fee.

On 21 January, Luke Southwood signed a new contract with Reading until the summer of 2021, and then returned to Hamilton Academical on loan until the end of the season.

On 30 January, Ben House returned to Dagenham & Redbridge on loan for the remainder of the season, U23 goalkeeper, Myles Roberts, left the club to sign for Watford, and Reading announced the signing of Felipe Araruna on a 2.5-year contract from São Paulo.

On 31 January, academy graduate Teddy Howe left to club to sign permanently with Blackpool, and Vito Mannone joined Esbjerg fB on loan for the remainder of the season. Later that same day, Reading announced that Marc McNulty had swapped a loan deal at Sunderland to join Hibernian until the end of the season, and that Ayub Masika had joined the club on loan from Beijing Renhe on loan until the end of the season.

February
On 8 February, Femi Azeez joined Bracknell Town on an initial 28-day loan deal.

On 11 February, Adam Liddle joined Derry City on loan until 30 June.

On 14 February, Akin Odimayo and Andre Burley both moved to Waterford on loan.

On 18 February, Imari Samuels signed his first professional contract with the club, keeping him at Reading until the summer of 2022, with Reading also confirming the signing of Joseph Ajose on a contract until the summer of 2021 after impressing on trial having left Port Vale.

March
On 2 March, Josh Hewitt signed his first professional contract, keeping him at Reading until the summer of 2021.

On 13 March, the EFL postponed all league fixtures until 3 April due to the COVID-19 pandemic.

On 19 March, the EFL postponed all league fixtures until 30 April due to the continuing coronavirus pandemic.

April
On 3 April, the EFL postponed all league fixtures indefinitely until it is safe to resume.

On 15 April, Reading announced that Chief Executive Nigel Howe and manager Mark Bowen agreed to defer a substantial percentage of their salary for April, May and June.

May
On 26 May, Reading's first team players agreed to a wage deferral for May, June and July.

On 29 May, Esbjerg fB announced that Vito Mannone's loan had been extended by a further month enabling him to finish the extended Danish Superliga season.

On 31 May, the EFL announced that the Championship had agreed to a provisional return date of 20 June to finish the season by 30 July, with the potential of Matchday squads being extended to 20 players, and 5 substitutions being permitted.

June
On 8 June, the EFL confirmed the revised schedule for the remaining nice games of the season.

On 18 June, Atlético Baleares announced that Jordan Holsgrove had returned to Reading, after they declined to extend Holsgrove's loan until the end of the Segunda División B play-offs.

On 26 June, Reading agreed contract extensions until the end of the season with Chris Gunter, Jordan Obita, Tyler Blackett, Gabriel Osho, Garath McCleary and Charlie Adam whilst it was announced that Danny Loader had turned down the contract extension, therefor leaving the club on 30 June 2020.

July
On 1 July, AS Monaco confirmed that the loan deals for Pelé's loan deal with Reading had been extended until the end of the season.

On 2 July Reading announced that Coniah Boyce-Clarke, James Holden and Augustus McGiff had all professional terms with the club, whilst Femi Azeez had signed a new one-year contract after previous deal had expired on 30 June. It was also confirmed that all five loan players, Lucas Boyé, Ovie Ejaria, Pelé, Ayub Masika and Matt Miazga, had extended their stay until the end of the season. Whilst the club confirmed that Liam Driscoll, Lexus Beeden, Andre Burley, Marcel Elva-Fountaine, Ramarni Medford-Smith, Akin Odimayo, Emmanuel Obamakinwa, Werick Caetano, Ethan Coleman, Tyler Frost, Pedro Neves, Roberto Nditi, Ben House and Adam Liddle had all left the club after their contracts had expired.

On 20 July, Reading confirmed the permanent transfer of Modou Barrow to Jeonbuk Hyundai Motors.

Ahead of the final game of the season, on 22 July, Rafael Cabral was announced as the player of the season.

On 25 July, Reading confirmed that Chris Gunter, Jordan Obita, Tyler Blackett, Garath McCleary and Charlie Adam would all be leaving the club when their contracts expired at the end of the month, whilst Gabriel Osho had been offered a new contract by the club.

Transfers

In

Out

Loans in

Loans out

Released

Trial

Squad

Left club during season

Friendlies

U23

Competitions

Championship

League table

Result summary

Results by matchday

Results

EFL Cup

FA Cup

Squad statistics

Appearances and goals

|-
|colspan="14"|Players who appeared for Reading but left during the season:

|}

Goal scorers

Clean sheets

Disciplinary record

Awards

Manager of the Month

Player of the Month

Player of the season

References

Match reports 

Reading
Reading F.C. seasons